The 2002–03 season was the 54th season in the history of UD Las Palmas and the club's first season back in the second division of Spanish football. In addition to the domestic league, Las Palmas participated in this season's edition of the Copa del Rey.

Transfers

In

Out

Competitions

Overall record

Segunda División

League table

Results summary

Results by round

Matches

Copa del Rey

Statistics

Appearances and goals

|-
! colspan=14 style=background:#DCDCDC; text-align:center| Goalkeepers

|-
! colspan=14 style=background:#DCDCDC; text-align:center| Defenders

|-
! colspan=14 style=background:#DCDCDC; text-align:center| Midfielders

|-
! colspan=14 style=background:#DCDCDC; text-align:center| Forwards

|-
! colspan=14 style=background:#DCDCDC; text-align:center| Players transferred out during the season

References

UD Las Palmas seasons
UD Las Palmas